KREU (92.3 FM) is a radio station broadcasting a Spanish Variety format. Licensed to Roland, Oklahoma, United States, it serves the Ft. Smith area. The station is currently owned by Star 92 Co.

External links
http://www.laraza923.com
 

REU
REU